Potamotrygon magdalenae, the Magdalena River stingray, is a species of freshwater fish in the family Potamotrygonidae. It is found only in the Magdalena and Atrato basins in Colombia, but it is locally abundant and among the predominant fish species in its range.

References 

magdalenae
Endemic fauna of Colombia
Freshwater fish of Colombia
Magdalena River
Taxa named by Auguste Duméril
Fish described in 1865